Kevin Brown (born 1 July 1941) is an Australian former cricketer. He played six first-class matches for Tasmania between 1965 and 1970.

Brown faced the first ball in the first-ever List A cricket match in Australia, the opening match of the Vehicle & General Australasian Knock-out Competition between Tasmania and Victoria on 22 November 1969 at the Melbourne Cricket Ground. The bowler was Alan Thomson. Brown made 14.

See also
 List of Tasmanian representative cricketers

References

External links
 

1941 births
Living people
Australian cricketers
Tasmania cricketers
Cricketers from Tasmania